Orlando is a Southern Italian-origin surname cognate with Roland.

Notable people with the surname include

Alberto Orlando (born 1938), Italian footballer
Alessandro Orlando (born 1970), Italian footballer
Alexandra Orlando (born 1987), Italian-Canadian rhythmic gymnast
Alfonso Orlando (1892–1969), Italian runner
Andrea Orlando (born 1969), Italian politician
Angelo Orlando (born 1965), Italian football coach
Bo Orlando (born 1966), American football player
Bobby Orlando (born 1958), American record producer
David Orlando (born 1971), Swiss footballer
Davide Orlando (born 1971), Swiss footballer
Diogo Orlando (born 1983), Brazilian footballer
Elena Orlando (born 1992), American ice hockey player
Francesco Orlando (disambiguation), multiple people
Gaetano Orlando (born 1962), Canadian-Italian ice hockey player
Gino Orlando (1929–2003), Brazilian footballer
Giovanni Orlando (born 1945), Italian swimmer
Jeffrey Pullicino Orlando (born 1963), Maltese politician
Jimmy Orlando (1916–1992), American ice hockey player
Joe Orlando (1927–1998), Italian-American illustrator
John Orlando (born 1960), Nigerian footballer
Johnny Orlando (born 2003), Canadian singer and actor
Jonathan Orlando (born 1987), American soccer player
Leoluca Orlando (born 1947), Italian politician
Luca Orlando (born 1990), Italian footballer
Luciano Orlando (1887–1915), Italian mathematician
Massimo Orlando (born 1971), Italian football coach
Matías Orlando (born 1991), Argentinian rugby union footballer
Mike Orlando (born 1970), American guitarist
Muriel Orlando (born 1989), Argentinian footballer
Orazio Orlando (1937–1990), Italian actor
Paulo Orlando (born 1985), Brazilian baseball player
Quentin Orlando (1919–2011), American politician
Ramón Orlando (born 1959), Dominican singer-songwriter
Robert Orlando (born 1964), American filmmaker
Roberto Orlando (disambiguation), multiple people
Ruggero Orlando (1907–1994), Italian journalist
Silvio Orlando (born 1957), Italian actor
Silvio Orlando (rugby union) (born 1981), Italian rugby union footballer
Simone Orlando, Canadian ballet dancer
Stefania Orlando (born 1966), Italian television personality
Taddeo Orlando (1885–1950), Italian general
Todd Orlando (born 1971), American football coach
Tony Orlando (born 1944), American singer-songwriter
Valerio Rocco Orlando (born 1978), Italian artist
Vittorio Emanuele Orlando (1860—1952), Italian politician

See also 

 Orlando (given name)

Italian-language surnames